Events from the year 1925 in Sweden

Incumbents
 Monarch – Gustaf V
 Prime Minister – Hjalmar Branting, Rickard Sandler

Events
 1 January – First day of radio broadcasting in Sweden: AB Radiotjänst (forerunner of Sveriges Radio) broadcasts its first programme. Gaston Borch conducts the Skandia Cinema Orchestra in the country's first broadcast of orchestral music.
 25 January – Hjalmar Branting resigns as Prime Minister because of ill health and is replaced by the minister of trade, Rickard Sandler.
5 April – The Swedish Bandy Association is founded in Stockholm out of the Swedish Football Association's former bandy section.

Births

 4 February – Arne Åhman, triple jumper, Olympic champion in 1948.
 27 April – Folke Eriksson, water polo player (died 2008).
 2 May – Inga Gill, film actress (died 2000)
 10 May – Hasse Jeppson, footballer
 24 May – Mai Zetterling, film actress and director (died 1994)
 11 July – Nicolai Gedda, operatic tenor (died 2017)
 4 November – Folke Sundquist, actor (died 2009)
 27 November – Kurt Lundquist, runner (died 2011).

Deaths
 14 February – Signe Hebbe, opera singer (born 1837)
 24 February – Hjalmar Branting, 19th Prime Minister of Sweden, recipient of the Nobel Peace Prize (born 1860)
 8 March – Arvid Knöppel, sport shooter (born 1867).
 2 June – Emilia Broomé, politician (born 1866) 
 3 October – Frigga Carlberg, women's rights activist (born 1851)

References

 
Sweden
Years of the 20th century in Sweden